The Ambassador of the United Kingdom to Costa Rica is the United Kingdom's foremost diplomatic representative in Costa Rica, and in charge of the UK's diplomatic mission in San José.

Heads of Mission
The Republic of Costa Rica proclaimed its independence in 1838. The United Kingdom was represented intermittently by chargés d'affaires until 1884, and from then until 1908 by ministers based in Guatemala. From 1908 until 1945 the Minister to Panama was also non-resident Minister to Costa Rica.

Early diplomats
1849 and 1850-1852: Frederick Chatfield Chargé d'Affaires

Envoy Extraordinary and Minister Plenipotentiary
1945–1948: Frederick Coultas
1948–1951: Bernard Sullivan
1951–1952: Henry Livingston
1953–1956: Clarence Ezard

Ambassador Extraordinary and Plenipotentiary
1956: Clarence Ezard
1956–1961: David Mill Irving
1961–1967: Frederic Garner
1968–1972: Ian Hurrell
1972–1974: John Blackwell
1974–1979: Keith Hamylton Jones
1979–1982: Michael Brown
1982–1986: Peter Summerscale
1986–1989: Michael Daly
1989–1992: William Marsden
1992–1995: Louise Croll
1995–1997: Mike Jackson
1997–1999: Alan Green
1999–2002: Peter Spiceley
2002–2006: Georgina Butler
2006–2011: Thomas Kennedy
2011–2015: Sharon Campbell

2015–: Ross Denny

References

External links
UK and Costa Rica, gov.uk

Costa Rica
 
United Kingdom ambassadors